Unplugged is a live album by English pop band, The Korgis. It was released in 2006.

The unplugged concert was originally only recorded for inclusion on the Kollection DVD in the summer of 2005, but was released as a proper album the following year. The album contains acoustic versions of all of the band's best known songs such as "Everybody's Got to Learn Sometime", "Young 'n' Russian", "If It's Alright With You Baby" and "If I Had You" as well as tracks from their albums The Korgis, Dumb Waiters, Sticky George, Burning Questions and This World's For Everyone

Track listing
"Cold Tea" (Warren) – 4:31 
"Dumb Waiters" (Warren) – 2:40 
"If I Had You" (Davis, Rachmaninoff) – 3:31 
"I Wonder What's Become of You" (Baker, Warren) – 3:35 
"That's What Friends Are For" (Davis, Ferguson) – 3:28 
"If It's Alright with You Baby" (Warren) – 3:29 
"Perfect Hostess" (Davis) – 3:17 
"Young 'n' Russian" (Davis, Ridlington, Warren) – 3:24 
"All the Love in the World" (Davis, Warren) – 3:44 
"Everybody's Got to Learn Sometime" (Warren) – 3:17 
"This World's for Everyone" (Warren) – 3:34 
"Lines" (Lindsey) – 3:17 
"It Won't Be the Same Old Place" (Davis, Warren) – 4:27 
"It All Comes Down to You" (Baker, Davis) – 3:48

Personnel
 Andy Davis – keyboards, guitars, backing vocals,
 James Warren – guitars, lead vocals, backing vocals
 John Baker – guitars, keyboards, lead vocals, backing vocals

Production
 The Korgis – producers

Release history
 2006 Angel Air SJPCD 213

References

The Korgis albums
2006 live albums